Juan David Restrepo  (born 10 December 1979 in Medellín, Colombia) is a Colombian television, theatre and film actor and film director. Restrepo also teaches modeling techniques, develops scripts, produces and directs short films.

Biography
Restrepo was first noticed by a scout from International Models and he appeared in many adverts, most notably for Diesel, Unlimited and Francois Girbaud, including a featured spread in Numéro. He was subsequently offered his first film role in Our Lady of the Assassins. He then attended German Jaramillo's Free Theatre School on full scholarship  and appeared in many theatre productions, television programmes and films. He directed and starred in the film 'El Coma' in 2011.

As a sportsman he has also played in the 2001 Copa Merconorte international football competition.

He and his wife Liliana Vanegas have one daughter, Luna.

Filmography
2012 The Squad -Ramos
2011 En Coma  -Omar, also Director
2006 El Don (Part 1 of Jose Ramon Novoa's Pablo Escobar trilogy)  - Kike
2005 Rosario Tijeras -Morsa
2004 Punto y Raya - Sgt. Requena
2000 Our Lady of the Assassins - Wilmar

2002 Siguiendo el rastro - Juancho
2001 Historias de hombres sólo para mujeres - (2 guest appearances)
1999 Francisco el matématico
2008 [ En coma, movie]

References

External links
 
'En Coma' article 
Actuemos interview 
video interview 
Septimo Arte interview 
https://twitter.com/juanjonf
https://web.archive.org/web/20110512025048/http://www.encomalapelicula.com/
https://twitter.com/fansjuanjonf

Colombian male television actors
1979 births
Living people
Colombian film directors
Colombian male film actors